Tovarich (the Russian word for "comrade" or "friend") is a 1937 American comedy film directed by Anatole Litvak, based on the 1935 play by Robert E. Sherwood, which in turn was based on the 1933 French play Tovaritch by Jacques Deval. It was produced by Litvak through Warner Bros., with Robert Lord as associate producer and Hal B. Wallis and Jack L. Warner as executive producers. The screenplay was by Casey Robinson from the French play by Jacques Deval adapted into English by Robert E. Sherwood. The music score was by Max Steiner and the cinematography by Charles Lang.

The film stars Claudette Colbert and Charles Boyer with Basil Rathbone, Anita Louise,  Melville Cooper, Isabel Jeans, Morris Carnovsky and Curt Bois in his American debut role.

Plot
Russian Prince Mikail Alexandrovitch Ouratieff (Charles Boyer) and his wife, Grand Duchess Tatiana Petrovna (Claudette Colbert) flee from the Russian Revolution to Paris with the Czar's fortune, which he has entrusted to them for safekeeping. They keep the money in a bank, faithfully refusing to spend any of it for themselves. Then, destitute, they are forced to take jobs under false identities as butler and maid in the household of wealthy Charles Dupont (Melville Cooper), his wife Fermonde (Isabel Jeans), and their children, Helene (Anita Louise) and Georges (Maurice Murphy). After a shaky start, the servants gradually endear themselves to their employers. However, their secret is finally exposed when one of the guests at a dinner party, Madame Chauffourier-Dubleff (Doris Lloyd), recognises them.

Cast
 Claudette Colbert as Grand Duchess Tatiana Petrovna Romanov
 Charles Boyer as Prince Mikail Alexandrovitch Ouratieff
 Basil Rathbone as Commissar Dimitri Gorotchenko
 Anita Louise as Helene Dupont
 Melville Cooper as Charles Dupont
 Isabel Jeans as Hermonde Dupont 
 Morris Carnovsky as Chauffourier Dubieff
 Victor Kilian as Gendarme
 Maurice Murphy as Georges Dupont 
 Gregory Gaye as Count Frederic Brekenski
 Montagu Love as M. Courtois
 Renie Riano as Madame Courtois 
 Fritz Feld as Martelleau
 Doris Lloyd as Madame Chauffourier-Dubleff
 Curt Bois as Alfonso 
 Jerry Tucker as Urchin (uncredited)

Sources
 The original play by Jacques Deval opened in Paris on 13 October 1933. Robert E. Sherwood's English adaptation opened in London on 24 April 1935 (Melville Cooper reprised his stage role for the movie), and on Broadway on Oct 15, 1936, starring Marta Abba. 
 The play was made into the Broadway musical Tovarich (1963) (book by David Shaw, music by Lee Pockriss and lyrics by Anne Croswell) starring Vivien Leigh and Jean-Pierre Aumont. It ran for 264 performances and won Leigh the Tony Award for Best Actress.

External links

 

 
Tovarich on Lux Radio Theater: May 15, 1939

1937 films
1935 plays
American films based on plays
Films based on works by Jacques Deval
American black-and-white films
Films scored by Max Steiner
Films directed by Anatole Litvak
1930s English-language films
Films set in Paris
1937 comedy films
American comedy films
American remakes of French films
Warner Bros. films
1930s American films